Cryptophyllium celebicum is type species of leaf insect in the new (2021) genus Cryptophyllium, which has been placed the tribe Phylliini.  Its recorded distribution is Sulawesi and Ambon Island.

References

External Links 

Phasmatodea of Malesia
Phylliidae